Cavisomidae are a family of parasitic worms from the order Echinorhynchida.

Species

Cavisomidae contains the following species:

Caballerorhynchus Salgado-Maldonado, 1977Caballerorhynchus lamothei Salgado-Maldonado, 1977Cavisoma Van Cleave, 1931Cavisoma magnum (Southwell, 1927) Van Cleave, 1931

C. magnum (Southwell, 1927) Van Cleave, 1931 was originally described as Oligoterorhynchus magnus by Southwell from the stomach and pyloric ceca of the sea bass, Serranus sp. Other hosts include milkfish Chanos chanos (Chanidae), Siganus lineatus (Siganidae), and Grey mullet, Mugil cephalus (Mugilidae). Localities include Sri Lanka, the Red Sea, the Philippines, New Caledonia, and Iraq.Echinorhynchoides Achmerov and Dombrovskaja-Achmerova, 1941	 Echinorhynchoides dogieli Achmerov and Dombrovskaja-Achmerova, 1941Femogibbosus Paruchin, 1973Femogibbosus assi Paruchin, 1973Filisoma Van Cleave, 1928Filisoma acanthocybii Wang, Wang & Wu, 1993Filisoma atropi Wang and Wang, 1988	Filisoma bucerium Van Cleave, 1940Filisoma fidum Van Cleve & Manter, 1947Filisoma filiformis Weaver & Smales, 2013 Filisoma indicum Van Cleave, 1928Filisoma inglisi Gupta & Naqvi, 1986Filisoma longcementglandatus Amin & Nahhas, 1994Filisoma micracanthi  Harada, 1938Filisoma oplegnathi Wang & Wang, 1988Filisoma rizalinum  Tubangui & Masiluñgan, 1946 Filisoma scatophagusi  Datta & Soota, 1962Megapriapus Golvan, Gracia-Rodrigo and Diaz-Ungria, 1964 Megapriapus ungriai (Gracia-Rodrigo, 1960)Neorhadinorhynchus Yamaguti, 1939Neorhadinorhynchus aspinosus (Fukui and Morisita, 1937)Neorhadinorhynchus atlanticus Gaevskaja & Nigmatulin, 1977Neorhadinorhynchus atypicalis Amin & Ha, 2011Neorhadinorhynchus macrospinosus Amin & Nahhas, 1994Neorhadinorhynchus madagascariensis Golvan, 1969Neorhadinorhynchus myctophumi Mordvilkova, 1988Neorhadinorhynchus nudus (Harada, 1938)Paracavisoma Kritscher, 1957Paracavisoma impudica (Diesing, 1851)Pseudocavisoma Golvan & Houin, 1964

 Pseudocavisoma chromitidis (Cable and Quick, 1954) Golvan & Houin, 1964Rhadinorhynchoides Fukui and Morisita, 1937Rhadinorhynchoides miyagawai' Fukui and Morisita, 1937

HostsCavisomidae '' species parasitize fish.

Notes

References

Echinorhynchida
Acanthocephala families